A special election was held in  on November 18, 1799 to replace a vacancy caused by Peleg Sprague (F) declining to serve in the 6th Congress.

Election result

Sheafe took his seat with the rest of the 6th Congress when the 1st session began on December 2, 1799

See also
List of special elections to the United States House of Representatives

References

Special elections to the 6th United States Congress
New Hampshire 1799 at-large
1799
1799 United States House of Representatives elections
1799 New Hampshire elections

United States House of Representatives 1799 at-large